Igor Popovec (born 6 May 1966) is a retired Slovak football striker.

References

1966 births
Living people
Slovak footballers
SK Sigma Olomouc players
FK Dukla Banská Bystrica players
FC Lokomotíva Košice players
MŠK Žilina players
Association football forwards
Czechoslovak First League players
People from Stropkov
Sportspeople from the Prešov Region